KNCE 93.5FM is a Freeform Variety formatted broadcast radio station licensed in Taos, New Mexico, serving Taos, Ranchos de Taos, and El Prado in New Mexico. KNCE is owned and operated by Taos Adventures, LLC.

KNCE broadcasts out of a 1978 Airstream Excella located on Taos Mesa, beside the Taos Mesa Brewing Mothership. KNCE operates with over 100 volunteer DJs, with live local DJs in studio from at least 7am - midnight every day.

References

External links
 KNCE Online
 

2013 establishments in New Mexico
Variety radio stations in the United States
Radio stations established in 2013
NCE